Ellie Beer (born 3 January 2003) is an Australian athlete. She competed in the women's 4 × 400 metres relay event at the 2019 World Athletics Championships. At the 2020 Tokyo Olympics, Beer was a member of the Australian team that competed in the women's 4 x 400 meter relay. The team of Kendra Hubbard and Annaliese Rubie-Renshaw and Bendere Oboya finished 7th in their heat and did not contest the final.

Early years 
Beer was six years old when she joined Gold Coast Little Athletics and Nippers at Currumbin Surf Club. She went undefeated in state and national beach sprints in her age group. By the age of 14, in 2017, Beer had already clocked 54.83 in the 400m and on the beach won the Australian under-14 flags and beach sprint titles.

Achievements 
As a 15 year old, Beer won the national U16 200m/400m double and in December 2018 the national U16 200m/400m double, closing the year with Personal Best (PB) times of 23.94/53.55. In the 2019 summer she won the Australian U17 200/400m double, but her major achievement was winning the Brisbane Track Classic 400m in a 0.9 seconds PB time of 52.53 to become the fourth fastest U18 in Australian history.

Beer was selected in the Australian team for the 2019 World Relays. She was part of the team that came fifth in the final. She was selected in the Australian team for the 2019 World Championships. At the age of 16 years and 268 days, Beer was the youngest ever Australian selected for the championships. Running a time of 52.0 seconds, Beer helped the Australian team to 3:28.64 and qualification for the Tokyo 2020 Olympics.

Domestically in 2021, at 18, she is the second best in Australia behind world championships semi-finalist Bendere Oboya.

References

External links
 

2003 births
Living people
Australian female sprinters
Place of birth missing (living people)
World Athletics Championships athletes for Australia
Athletes (track and field) at the 2020 Summer Olympics
Olympic athletes of Australia
21st-century Australian women